G, or g, is the seventh letter in the Latin alphabet, used in the modern English alphabet, the alphabets of other western European languages and others worldwide. Its name in English is gee (pronounced ), plural gees.

History

The letter 'G' was introduced in the Old Latin period as a variant of 'C' to distinguish voiced  from voiceless . 

The recorded originator of 'G' is freedman Spurius Carvilius Ruga, who added letter G to the teaching of the Roman alphabet during the 3rd century BC: he was the first Roman to open a fee-paying school, around 230 BCE. At this time, 'K' had fallen out of favor, and 'C', which had formerly represented both  and  before open vowels, had come to express  in all environments.

Ruga's positioning of 'G' shows that alphabetic order related to the letters' values as Greek numerals was a concern even in the 3rd century BC. According to some records, the original seventh letter, 'Z', had been purged from the Latin alphabet somewhat earlier in the 3rd century BC by the Roman censor Appius Claudius, who found it distasteful and foreign. Sampson (1985) suggests that: "Evidently the order of the alphabet was felt to be such a concrete thing that a new letter could be added in the middle only if a 'space' was created by the dropping of an old letter."  

George Hempl proposed in 1899 that there never was such a "space" in the alphabet and that in fact 'G' was a direct descendant of zeta.  Zeta took shapes like ⊏ in some of the Old Italic scripts; the development of the monumental form 'G' from this shape would be exactly parallel to the development of 'C' from gamma.  He suggests that the pronunciation  >  was due to contamination from the also similar-looking 'K'.

Eventually, both velar consonants  and  developed palatalized allophones before front vowels; consequently in today's Romance languages,  and  have different sound values depending on context (known as hard and soft C and hard and soft G).  Because of French influence, English language orthography shares this feature.

Typographic variants

The modern lowercase 'g' has two typographic variants: the single-storey (sometimes opentail) '' and the double-storey (sometimes looptail) ''. The single-storey form derives from the majuscule (uppercase) form by raising the serif that distinguishes it from 'c' to the top of the loop, thus closing the loop and extending the vertical stroke downward and to the left. The double-storey form  had developed similarly, except that some ornate forms then extended the tail back to the right, and to the left again, forming a closed bowl or loop. The initial extension to the left was absorbed into the upper closed bowl. The double-storey version became popular when printing switched to "Roman type" because the tail was effectively shorter, making it possible to put more lines on a page. In the double-storey version, a small top stroke in the upper-right, often terminating in an orb shape, is called an "ear".

Generally, the two forms are complementary, but occasionally the difference has been exploited to provide contrast. The 1999 Handbook of the International Phonetic Association, the successor to the Principles, abandoned the recommendation and acknowledged both shapes as acceptable variants.

Wong et al. (2018) found that native English speakers have little conscious awareness of the looptail 'g'   They write: "Despite being questioned repeatedly, and despite being informed directly that G has two lowercase print forms, nearly half of the participants failed to reveal any knowledge of the looptail 'g', and only 1 of the 38 participants was able to write looptail 'g' correctly."

In Unicode, the two appearances are generally treated as glyph variants with no semantic difference. For applications where the single-storey variant must be distinguished (such as strict IPA in a typeface where the usual g character is double-storey), the character  is available, as well as an upper case version, .

Pronunciation and use

English
In English, the letter appears either alone or in some digraphs.  Alone, it represents
 a voiced velar plosive ( or "hard" ), as in goose, gargoyle, and game;
 a voiced palato-alveolar sibilant in post-medieval loanwords from French, such as rouge, beige, genre (often), and margarine (rarely)

It is hard in those derivations from γυνή (gynḗ) meaning woman where initial-worded as such. Soft  is also used in many words that came into English from medieval church/academic use, French, Spanish, Italian or Portuguese – these tend to, in other ways in English, closely align to their Ancient Latin and Greek roots (such as  fragile, logic or magic).

The double consonant  has the value  (hard ) as in nugget, with very few exceptions:  in exaggerate and veggies and dialectally  in suggest.

The digraph  has the value  (soft ), as in badger. Non-digraph  can also occur, in compounds like floodgate and headgear.

The digraph  may represent:
 a velar nasal as in length, singer
 the latter followed by hard  as in jungle, finger, longest
Non-digraph  also occurs, with possible values
  as in engulf, ungainly
  as in sponge, angel
  as in melange

  as in ghost, aghast, burgher, spaghetti
  as in cough, laugh, roughage
 Ø (no sound) as in through, neighbor, night 
  in ugh
 (rarely)  in hiccough
 (rarely)  in s'ghetti
Non-digraph  also occurs, in compounds like foghorn, pigheaded

The digraph  may represent:
  as in gnostic, deign, foreigner, signage
  in loanwords like champignon, lasagna
Non-digraph  also occurs, as in signature, agnostic

The trigraph   has the value  as in gingham or dinghy. Non-trigraph  also occurs, in compounds like stronghold and dunghill.

G is the tenth least frequently used letter in the English language (after Y, P, B, V, K, J, X, Q, and Z), with a frequency of about 2.02% in words.

Other languages

In Italian and Romanian,  is used to represent  before front vowels where  would otherwise represent a soft value. In Italian, the trigraph , when appearing before a vowel or as the article and pronoun gli, represents the palatal lateral approximant .

Other languages typically use  to represent  regardless of position.

Amongst European languages, Czech, Dutch, Estonian and Finnish are an exception as they do not have  in their native words. In Dutch,  represents a voiced velar fricative  instead, a sound that does not occur in modern English, but there is a dialectal variation: many Netherlandic dialects use a voiceless fricative ( or ) instead, and in southern dialects it may be palatal . Nevertheless, word-finally it is always voiceless in all dialects, including the standard Dutch of Belgium and the Netherlands. On the other hand, some dialects (like Amelands) may have a phonemic .

The Azerbaijani Latin alphabet uses  exclusively for the "soft" sound, namely . This leads to unusual spellings of loanwords: qram 'gram', qrup 'group', qaraj 'garage', qallium 'gallium'.

Related characters

Ancestors, descendants and siblings
 𐤂 : Semitic letter Gimel, from which the following symbols originally derive
 C c : Latin letter C, from which G derives
  : Greek letter Gamma, from which C derives in turn
 ɡ : Latin letter script small G
 ᶢ : Modifier letter small script g is used for phonetic transcription
 𝼁 : Latin small letter reversed script g, an extension to IPA for disordered speech (extIPA)
 ᵷ : Turned g
 𝼂 : Latin letter small capital turned g, an extension to IPA for disordered speech (extIPA)
 Г г : Cyrillic letter Ge
 Ȝ ȝ : Latin letter Yogh
 Ɣ ɣ : Latin letter Gamma
 Ᵹ ᵹ : Insular g
 ᫌ : Combining insular g, used in the Ormulum
 Ꝿ ꝿ : Turned insular g
 Ꟑ ꟑ : Closed insular g, used in the Ormulum
 ɢ : Latin letter small capital G, used in the International Phonetic Alphabet to represent a voiced uvular stop
 𐞒 : Modifier letter small capital G, used as a superscript IPA letter
 ʛ : Latin letter small capital G with hook, used in the International Phonetic Alphabet to represent a voiced uvular implosive
 𐞔 : Modifier letter small capital G with hook, used as a superscript IPA letter
 𐞓 : Modifier letter small g with hook, used as a superscript IPA letter
 ᴳ ᵍ : Modifier letters are used in the Uralic Phonetic Alphabet
 ꬶ : Used for the Teuthonista phonetic transcription system
 G with diacritics: Ǵ ǵ Ǥ ǥ Ĝ ĝ Ǧ ǧ Ğ ğ Ģ ģ Ɠ ɠ Ġ ġ Ḡ ḡ Ꞡ ꞡ ᶃ
ց : Armenian alphabet Tso

Ligatures and abbreviations
 ₲ : Paraguayan guaraní

Computing codes

 1

Other representations

See also
 Carolingian G
 Hard and soft G

References

External links
 
 
 
 Lewis and Short Latin Dictionary: G

ISO basic Latin letters